Dooneen is a townland approximately two miles north of Castleisland, County Kerry on the N21 road to Limerick. Dooneen Wood and Castleisland golf course are situated in the area. Journalist Con Houlihan was born in Dooneen.

Dooneen is also the name of Dooneen Point, also in County Kerry, and two townlands in County Clare.

References

Townlands of County Kerry